Gunārs is a Latvian masculine given name. It is a cognate of the name Gunnar and may refer to:
Gunārs Astra (1931–1988), Latvian human rights activist and anti-Soviet dissident
Gunārs Birkerts (1925–2017), Latvian-born American architect
Gunārs Cilinskis (1931–1992), Latvian actor, film director and screenwriter
Gunārs Ķirsons (born 1951), Latvian entrepreneur and businessman
Gunārs Lūsis (born 1950), Latvian artist and graphic designer
Gunārs Piesis (1935–1996), Latvian film director
Gunārs Priede (1928–2000), Latvian playwright, engineer and architect
Gunārs Saliņš (1924–2010), Latvian modernist poet 
Gunārs Skvorcovs (born 1990), Latvian ice hockey right winger
Gunārs Ulmanis (1938–2010), Latvian football right wing midfielder

References

Latvian masculine given names